Joe Harper (born c. 1936) is an American football coach and former player.  He is the offensive quality control coach at California Polytechnic State University.  Harper served as the head football coach at Cal Poly from 1968 to 1981, at Northern Arizona University from 1982 to 1984, and at California Lutheran University from 1990 to 1995, compiling a career coaching record of 131–95–4.  He led the 1980 Cal Poly Mustangs football team to the NCAA Division II Football Championship.  Harper rejoined the Cal Poly Mustangs football program in 2011.

A native of Glendale, California, Harper attended the University of California, Los Angeles (UCLA), where he lettered in football for three seasons, from 1956 to 1958.  He was co-captain of the 1957 UCLA Bruins football team.  Harper graduated from UCLA in 1959 and spent one season coaching at his alma mater, as an assistant for the freshmen football team.  He moved on to Riverside City College before serving as line coach at the University of California, Santa Barbara in 1962.  From 1963 to 1967 Harper worked as an offensive line coach at the University of Colorado Boulder under Eddie Crowder.  Harper was hired as the head football coach at Cal Poly in February 1968.  That July he was appointed as the school's athletic director.

Head coaching record

College

References

External links
 Cal Poly profile

1930s births
Living people
American football guards
Cal Lutheran Kingsmen football coaches
Cal Poly Mustangs athletic directors
Cal Poly Mustangs football coaches
Colorado Buffaloes football coaches
Northern Arizona Lumberjacks football coaches
Riverside City Tigers football coaches
UC Santa Barbara Gauchos football coaches
UCLA Bruins football players
Sportspeople from Glendale, California
Coaches of American football from California
Players of American football from California